Dawn Lundy Martin is an American poet, essayist and activist. She has received a number of awards such as the Academy of American Arts and Science's May Sarton Prize for Poetry. Martin is currently faculty at University of Pittsburgh and director of the Center for African American Poetry and Poetics. Martin received the 2019 Kingsley Tufts Poetry Award for her book Good Stock, Strange Blood published by Coffee House Press.

Education and career 
Martin earned a BA at the University of Connecticut, an MA at San Francisco State University, and a PhD at the University of Massachusetts Amherst.

Martin has taught at the University of Pittsburgh, Montclair State University, The New School, and Bard College.

Works 
 
 
 A Gathering of Matter/A Matter of Gathering (2007, winner of the Cave Canem Poetry Prize) 
 
 Discipline (2011, winner of the Nightboat Books Prize)
 Life in a Box is a Pretty Life (Nightboat Books, 2015)
  Good Stock, Strange Blood (2017)

References

External links 
 Interview with the Rumpus
 Interview with the Library of Congress

Year of birth missing (living people)
Living people
21st-century American poets
American women poets
University of Pittsburgh faculty
Lambda Literary Award for Lesbian Poetry winners
American LGBT poets
21st-century American women writers
University of Connecticut alumni
American women academics
21st-century American LGBT people
American lesbian writers